Marcapomacocha District is one of ten districts of the  Yauli Province in the Junín Region in Peru.

Geography 
Some of the highest mountains of the district are listed below:

See also 
 Aququcha
 Markapumaqucha
 Markaqucha
 P'ukruqucha

References